Kampong Tralach may refer to:

 Kampong Tralach District, a district of Kampong Chhnang province
 Kampong Tralach (town), the capital of Kampong Tralach district
 Kampong Tralach (commune), a commune in Kampong Tralach district